The Bowers Covered Bridge (aka Brownsville Bridge) is a historic covered bridge, carrying Bible Hill Road across Mill Brook in the Brownsville section of West Windsor, Vermont.  Built in 1919, it has a laminated-arch deck covered by a post-and-beam superstructure, similar to Best's Covered Bridge, Windsor's other historic covered bridge.  It was listed on the National Register of Historic Places in 1973.  It was rebuilt after being swept off its foundation in 2011 by Hurricane Irene, but has been damaged by vehicle strikes several times since then, and is being considered for closure.

Description and history
The Bowers Covered Bridge is located in southern West Windsor, carrying Bible Hill Road across Mill Brook between Vermont Route 44 and Harrington and Westgate Roads. The bridge is a single span laminated arch structure resting on unmortared stone abutments, and covered by a post-and-beam shed. Its sides are finished in vertical board siding, and its roof is corrugated metal. Wooden floor stringers are supported by iron rods and wooden posts attached to the arches.

The bridge was built in 1919.  It is one of two bridges in the town, and only one of three known in the state to use this type of laminated arch construction.  The bridge was swept off its abutments by Hurricane Irene 2011, but rebuilt and reopened in 2012.  It has since been struck several times by larger vehicles, resulting in structural damage.  As of April 2016, the town is considering closing the bridge to traffic.

See also
 National Register of Historic Places listings in Windsor County, Vermont
 List of bridges on the National Register of Historic Places in Vermont
 List of Vermont covered bridges
 "Bowers Covered Bridge Restoration" (video via YouTube), Brownsville, Vermont, Mary 19, 2012

References

Covered bridges on the National Register of Historic Places in Vermont
National Register of Historic Places in Windsor County, Vermont
Buildings and structures in West Windsor, Vermont
Covered bridges in Windsor County, Vermont
Road bridges on the National Register of Historic Places in Vermont
Wooden bridges in Vermont
1919 establishments in Vermont
Bridges completed in 1919